San Fernando Cemetery may refer to: 

Panteón de San Fernando, Mexico City, Mexico
Cemetery of San Fernando, Seville, Spain
San Fernando Mission Cemetery, Los Angeles, California, United States
San Fernando Pioneer Memorial Cemetery, Los Angeles, California, United States